Rex Leland Bennett (25 June 1896 – 14 December 1963) was an Australian cricketer. He played five first-class matches for South Australia between 1922 and 1923 and three for Tasmania between 1924 and 1926.

See also
 List of South Australian representative cricketers
 List of Tasmanian representative cricketers

References

External links
 

1896 births
1963 deaths
Australian cricketers
South Australia cricketers
Tasmania cricketers